Will Longwitz (born November 30, 1972 in Meridian, Mississippi) is an attorney and American politician from Mississippi. A Republican, Longwitz was elected to the Mississippi Senate in 2011. He is a graduate of Georgetown University and the University of Mississippi School of Law. He is vice chair of the Senate Constitution committee. He lives in Madison, Mississippi.

References

Republican Party Mississippi state senators
Georgetown University alumni
University of Mississippi School of Law alumni
Politicians from Meridian, Mississippi
People from Madison, Mississippi
1972 births
Living people